The 1970 football season was São Paulo's 41st season since club's existence.

Statistics

Scorers

Overall
{|class="wikitable"
|-
|Games played || 61 (18 Campeonato Paulista, 16 Torneio Roberto Gomes Pedrosa, 27 Friendly match)
|-
|Games won || 23 (12 Campeonato Paulista, 3 Torneio Roberto Gomes Pedrosa, 8 Friendly match)
|-
|Games drawn || 20 (3 Campeonato Paulista, 5 Torneio Roberto Gomes Pedrosa, 12 Friendly match)
|-
|Games lost || 18 (3 Campeonato Paulista, 8 Torneio Roberto Gomes Pedrosa, 7 Friendly match)
|-
|Goals scored || 81
|-
|Goals conceded || 69
|-
|Goal difference || +12
|-
|Best result || 8–0 (H) v Mitsubishi - Friendly match - 1970.02.01
|-
|Worst result || 0–4 (A) v Santos - Friendly match - 1970.03.21
|-
|Top scorer || Toninho Guerreiro (17)
|-

Friendlies

Taça São Paulo

Official competitions

Campeonato Paulista

Record

Torneio Roberto Gomes Pedrosa

Record

External links
official website 

Association football clubs 1970 season
1970
1970 in Brazilian football